In mid-January 2022, the Southern Cone had a severe heat wave, which made the region for a while the hottest place on earth, with temperatures exceeding those of the Middle East. This extreme weather event was associated with the Atlantic anticyclone, a particularly intense La Niña phenomenon in the Pacific Ocean, and the regional effects of climate change.

In addition, thousands of hectares were destroyed by wildfires across the region.

By country

Argentina 

On January 10, the temperatures were "particularly anomalous" in the south of the Pampas region and the north of the Patagonia.

On January 11, Buenos Aires reached , which was the second maximum temperature at the moment since there are systematic records. That day almost  were registered in San Juan, a few tenths of the monthly record for January. On January 12 the city saw 3 heat-related deaths. On January 14, Buenos Aires reached , which became the second highest temperature recorded, surpassing that recorded three days earlier.

During the wave, new electric energy consumption records were set at the national level, above 28,000 MW. On January 11, a massive blackout affected 700,000 users in the north of Buenos Aires and Greater Buenos Aires. To avoid blackouts, the Argentine government asked the industrial sector to reduce energy demand between January 13 and 14, with the aim of being able to provide energy to the home network. In addition, it decreed teleworking for two days for public employees and urged provincial governments to take similar measures. During the most intense week of the heat wave, Argentina imported energy from Brazil and Uruguay.

In the midst of the heat wave, and after important fires registered in the previous weeks, especially in Patagonia, the national government declared a fire emergency throughout the country for one year. Fires were recorded in the grasslands and wooded area near Canning and Tristán Suárez, in Ezeiza, which affected some 130 hectares. In Corrientes, a series of wildfires took place, which consumed around 800,000 hectares, which is equivalent to approximately ten percent of the province.

Uruguay 
Initially, the Uruguayan Institute of Meteorology (INUMET) issued an alert for the heat wave in the north, center and west of the country, but on January 13 it was extended to the entire country. On January 14, Florida reached , the highest temperature ever recorded in the country, matching a 1943 record. 14 of the 19 departments of the country reached a temperature above  during the wave.

The heat wave affected the generation of wind power due to the lack of wind, which resulted in 50% of the electrical energy having to be generated with the thermal power stations of the National Administration of Power Plants and Electrical Transmissions (UTE). On January 14, a blackout affected around 25,000 electricity network users in the Canelones, Montevideo and Treinta y Tres departments. On that day the country's energy consumption record was broken, reaching 2,139 MW.

After four days of heat wave, the National Directorate of Firefighters reported more than 100 active fires in different parts of the country, such as Paysandú and Rio Negro. This weather event intensified the drought, which had triggered a declaration of "agricultural emergency" in December 2021. In addition, it caused the death of 400,000 chickens, for an estimated value of 1.5 million dollars, due to this, the Ministry of Livestock, Agriculture and Fisheries declared the "poultry emergency".

See also 

 2022 heat waves
 Climate change in the Americas
 List of weather records

References 

2022 in Uruguay
2022 in Paraguay
2022 in Brazil
2022 in Argentina
2022 natural disasters
2022 heat waves
2022 meteorology
Southern Cone